Paulo Cesar Hartung Gomes (born April 21, 1957) is a Brazilian politician and was the Governor of the Brazilian state of Espírito Santo from 2003 until 2010. He served as Governor of Espírito Santo for a third, nonconsecutive term from January 1, 2015, to January 1, 2019.

Biography
Paulo Hartung began his political career in the student movement, in a troubled period of Brazilian history, which were the last years of the military regime in 1964, which started with the deposition of João Goulart. Linked to the Brazilian Communist Party (PCB) at the time of the military dictatorship, Hartung was elected the first president of the DCE (the Students' Central Directory) when he was a student of UFES.

In 1979, he actively participated in the process that restructured the National Union of Students, having served as organizer of Espirito Santo bench and mobilizing delegates across the country to the entity's reconstruction congress representing all Brazilian students, held in Salvador, capital the state of Bahia.

Hartung joined the Brazilian Democratic Movement Party in 1982, and therefore initiated its political party trajectory. At 25-year-old, he was elected state representative to a four-year term (1983-1987), standing out as the youngest parliamentarian of the Legislative Assembly of the Espírito Santo.

On expiry of the mandate, he was re-elected in 1986 for a new four-year term (1987-1990) and participated in drafting the State Constitution. In his passage through the Assembly he was concerned with the defense of the civil service, and deal with fundamental issues for society, such as the environment, health, education, public transportation, among others.

In 1990, Hartung won the mandate of Congressman (1991-1995), with the highest vote in the City of Vitória, the state capital. His outstanding performance led to assume the post of deputy leader of the Party of Brazilian Social Democracy in the House, whose leadership was exercised by José Serra, then federal deputy for Sao Paulo, most important federal unit of the Brazilian Republic.

In 1992, municipal elections were held across the country and in them Paulo Hartung launched his candidacy and was elected Mayor of Vitória (1993-1997). In early 1997, he handed over his charge to his elected successor, Luiz Paulo Vellozo Lucas, also of the PSDB, and participated in the United States at the invitation of the Embassy of that country, the intensive program on Public Administration and Political System in the United States.

After returning to Brazil, Paulo Hartung took at the invitation of President Fernando Henrique Cardoso, his co-religionist of party, the Board of Regional Development and the BNDES (National Bank for Economic and Social Development). In the first year of management, folder invested 1.4 billion dollars in social projects.

In 1998, 41 years old, young politician, but accumulating vast experience in the Federal, State and Municipal Executive and Legislative Powers, Paulo Hartung ran for the Senate of the Republic and was elected with the most votes (780,000 votes) that a political already received in Espírito Santo.

In 2002, affiliated to the Brazilian Socialist Party, Hartung was elected in the first round, state governor with 820,000 votes cast, representing 54% of the votes. He took office on January 1, 2003, to receive his predecessor, Jose Ignacio Ferreira, a free credit status among federal and global financial bodies, heavily in debt, with serious problems in the administrative machine and unable to investments necessary in social areas and the physical structure (construction of schools and rehabilitation of roads, for example). In the first term at the head of the State Executive, he managed to somehow recover the finances and also, to some extent, the tarnished image of Espírito Santo at the federal level.

See also
 List of mayors of Vitória, Espírito Santo

References

Governors of Espírito Santo
Members of the Federal Senate (Brazil)
Members of the Chamber of Deputies (Brazil) from Espírito Santo
Members of the Legislative Assembly of Espírito Santo
Mayors of places in Brazil
Brazilian economists
Brazilian Democratic Movement politicians
People from Espírito Santo
Brazilian people of German descent
Living people
1957 births